Gordale Scar is a limestone ravine  northeast of Malham, North Yorkshire, England. The gorge could have been formed by water from melting glaciers or a cavern collapse.

Notable visitors
William Wordsworth wrote in the sonnet Gordale, "let thy feet repair to Gordale chasm, terrific as the lair where the young lions couch".

James Ward created a large and imaginative painting of it that can be seen in Tate Britain. J. M. W. Turner also painted a picture of it in 1816, also to be seen in Tate Britain.

Colin Tudge references this feature and James Ward's painting in his book The Time Before History.

The waterfall was used as an exterior filming location in the 1982 film The Dark Crystal. Goredale Scar appears in the Netflix series The Witcher (S2 E3: "What is Lost").

Image gallery

References

Yorkshire Dales
Waterfalls of North Yorkshire
Craven District
Canyons and gorges of England